is a Japanese television series directed by Takashi Miike. The show is an adaptation of a manga series by Tetsuya Koshiba about a schoolgirl with power fighting abilities.

Cast
Jun Matsuda
Yoshihiko Hakamada
Runa Nagai
Yuki Matsuoka
Natsumi Yokoyama
Shunsuke Matsuoka
Masako Ikeda
Kôji Tsukamoto
Yuko Miyamura

Background and production
Tennen Shōjo Man was director Takashi Miike's first television production since 1992's Last Run. The series is not episodic, but works as self-contained three-and-a-half-hour-long film. The show is set in Tokyo.

Release
Tennen Shōjo Man was first shown in Japan on February 22, 1999. The show has been released on VHS and DVD by Pony Canyon in Japan.

Episodes

Notes

References

External links 
 
 "Kung Fu Schoolgirls"—a review of Tennen Shōjo Man

Japanese television series
1999 Japanese television series debuts
Television shows based on manga
Films set in Tokyo
Japanese high school films
1990s Japanese films